Michael Douglas (born 1944) is an American actor and film producer.

Michael Douglas may also refer to:
Mike Douglas (1920–2006), stage name of Michael Delaney Dowd Jr., American talk show host
Michael Keaton (born 1951), actor whose birth name is Michael John Douglas
Michael Crichton (1942–2008), author and screenwriter, used the pen name Michael Douglas
Michael R. Douglas (born 1961), physicist prominent in string theory
Michael Dutton Douglas (1945–1963), killed in a car accident involving future First Lady Laura Bush
Michael Douglas (skeleton racer) (born 1971), Canadian skeleton racer
Michael Douglas (politician) (1940–1992), Dominican politician
Michael L. Douglas (born 1944), Chief Justice of the Supreme Court of Nevada

See also

Mike Douglass (disambiguation)